Ivana Čabarkapa (born 7 September 1999) is a Montenegrin footballer who plays as a goalkeeper and has appeared for the Montenegro women's national team.

Career
Čabarkapa has been capped for the Montenegro national team, appearing for the team during the UEFA Women's Euro 2021 qualifying cycle.

References

External links
 
 
 

1999 births
Living people
Montenegrin women's footballers
Montenegro women's international footballers
Women's association football goalkeepers
ŽFK Breznica players